The 1948 All-Ireland Senior Hurling Championship was the 62nd staging of the All-Ireland hurling championship since its establishment by the Gaelic Athletic Association in 1887. The championship began on 16 May 1948 and ended on 5 September 1948.

Kilkenny were the defending champions, however, they were defeated in the provincial championship. Waterford won the All-Ireland crown for the first time in their history, following a 6-7 to 4-2 defeat of Dublin in the final.

Format

The All-Ireland Senior Hurling Championship was run on a provincial basis as usual.  All games were played on a knockout basis whereby once a team lost they were eliminated from the championship.  The format for the All-Ireland series of games ran as follows: 
 The winners of the Leinster Championship advanced directly to the first All-Ireland semi-final.  
 The winners of the Munster Championship advanced directly to the second All-Ireland semi-final.  
 Antrim, the representatives from the Ulster Championship, were drawn to play the Leinster champions in the All-Ireland semi-final.
 Galway, a team who faced no competition in the Connacht Championship, entered the championship at the All-Ireland semi-final stage where they were drawn to play the Munster champions.

Results

Leinster Senior Hurling Championship

First round

Semi-finals

Final

Munster Senior Hurling Championship

First round

Semi-finals

Final

All-Ireland Senior Hurling Championship

Semi-finals

Final

Championship statistics

Top scorers

Overall

In a single game

Sources
 Corry, Eoghan, The GAA Book of Lists (Hodder Headline Ireland, 2005).
 Donegan, Des, The Complete Handbook of Gaelic Games (DBA Publications Limited, 2005).

1948